The Parkway is a major arterial road in the city of St. John's, Newfoundland and Labrador.  It consists of three distinct roads that form a single through route: Columbus Drive, Prince Philip Drive, and Macdonald Drive.  A four-lane limited-access road with a speed limit of 70 km/h along most of its length, the parkway begins at an intersection with Pitts Memorial Drive in the city's west end and terminates at Logy Bay Road in the east end.

Segments 
Columbus Drive runs in a general south-to-north direction from Pitts Memorial Drive to Thorburn Road.  It passes Bowring Park, the Village Mall, the edge of the west end residential area, and the Avalon Mall.  Also known as the Crosstown Arterial, Columbus Drive was constructed in order to improve traffic circulation in the city by linking Kenmount Road and Prince Philip Drive with Topsail Road and Pitts Memorial Drive.  Built on land purchased by the city in 1970, the road was opened in December 1981.

Prince Philip Drive, constructed in the late 1960s, runs in an east-west direction from Thorburn Road to Portugal Cove Road.  Passing through Pippy Park, Prince Philip Drive provides access to several significant institutions: the Health Sciences Centre and Janeway Children's Hospital, the CBC's St. John's studios, the main Memorial University of Newfoundland campus, the St. John's Arts and Culture Centre, the Confederation Building, and the College of the North Atlantic.

Macdonald Drive runs in an east-west direction from Portugal Cove Road to Logy Bay Road.  Unlike Columbus Drive and Prince Philip Drive, Macdonald Drive is not a limited-access road and is intersected by several residential side streets.

Safety 
In 2006, seven of the ten most dangerous intersections in the city of St. John's were located on the Parkway. In order of severity, these were:
 Allandale Road at Prince Philip Drive (ranking 3)
 Columbus Drive at Old Pennywell Road (ranking 4)
 Prince Philip Drive at Thorburn Road (ranking 5)
 Columbus Drive at Topsail Road (ranking 6)
 Columbus Drive at Mundy Pond Road (ranking 7)
 Prince Philip Drive-Macdonald Drive at Portugal Cove Road (ranking 9)
 Prince Philip Drive at Clinch-Westerland (ranking 10)

In 2013, five of the ten most dangerous intersections in the city of St. John's were located on the Parkway. In order of severity, these were:
 Columbus Drive at Topsail Road (ranking 2)
 Allandale Road at Prince Philip Drive (ranking 5)
 Prince Philip Drive at Thorburn Road (ranking 6)
 Blackmarsh Road at Columbus Drive (ranking 8)
 Macdonald Drive at Torbay Road (ranking 9)

Intersections 
The following roads intersect with the Parkway.  Macdonald Drive is also intersected by several residential side streets, which are not listed in the table.

References

Streets in St. John's, Newfoundland and Labrador